Prowlers of the Everglades is a 1953 American short documentary film directed by James Algar. The film was produced by Ben Sharpsteen as part of the True-Life Adventures series of nature documentaries. It was shot in Technicolor by Alfred Milotte and his wife Elma, who were on assignment for nearly a year, making film reports on every aspect of the Everglades.

Summary
A photographic study of the wildlife of the Florida Everglades describes the habits of the many birds found in the swamplands and explains that the alligator rules over the area, devouring all varieties of wildlife with impartiality.

Cast
Winston Hibler as Narrator

References

External links

1953 short films
1950s English-language films
American short documentary films
1950s short documentary films
Disney documentary films
Documentary films about nature
Short films directed by James Algar
Disney short films
Films produced by Ben Sharpsteen
1953 documentary films
RKO Pictures short films
1950s American films